Stascha Rohmer (born June 29 June 1966 in Trier, Germany) is a German philosopher. His main research topics are Metaphysics, Anthropology, Philosophy of Nature and Philosophy of Law. He is a specialist of the Metaphysics of Hegel and Alfred North Whitehead and since 2008 permanent member of the Whitehead Research Project in Claremont, California, United States. Rohmer has a daughter and a son.

Biography 

Stascha Rohmer was born in 1966 in the city of Trier, Germany. His mother is the pedagogue Hildegard Rohmer-Stänner, and his father the architect Erhard Rohmer. Rohmer finished highschool at Beethoven-Gymnasium in the city of Bonn and pursued his higher studies in Philosophy and Hispanic Studies at the Freie Universität Berlin and Technische Universität Berlin. 
Due to a proposal by Hans Poser and Michael Theunissen, Rohmer was admitted as a member of the renowned scientific organization Studienstiftung. His PHD thesis focused on the Metaphysics of Alfred North Whitehead. His directors during his PHD were Hans Posers and Reiner Wiehl. 
Between the years of 1999 and 2014, Rohmer investigated and taught at the Institute for Philosophy of Humboldt-Universität Berlin and at the Institute for Philosophy Consejo Superior de Investigaciones Científicas in Madrid.

Rohmer’s research has been supported by many recognized scientific organizations such as the German Academic Exchange Service, the Deutschen Forschungsgemeinschaft, the Meyer-Struckmann Foundation, and the Fritz Thyssen Foundation.

Between 2008 and 2010, Rohmer was holder of an Intra-European Fellowship in the Program Marie Skłodowska-Curie Actions of the European Union. Rohmer wrote various monographs which parts especially from the philosophy of Hegel, Ortega y Gasset, Alfred North Whitehead and Helmuth Plessner.

He also translated the Spanish Philosopher Ortega y Gasset and the English Philosopher Alfred North Whitehead in German and edited their work in the  publishing companies Suhrkamp Verlag and Karl Alber. His book Love - Future of an Emotion, (original title: Liebe - Zukunft einer Emotion) was translated in Spanish and was edited in Herder publishing house, Barcelona. It was presented in the channel, TVE2 in Spain.

In 2015 he becomes a full-time Professor of Philosophy of Law at the Faculty of Law in the Universidad de Medellín in Medellín, Colombia. In 2016 he becomes the director of the Philosophy of Law program. One of the main goals of his research is to establish a bridging between Environmental philosophy, Philosophy of Law and Environmental law. He was the director of the first international congress Protection of Biodiversity as a Philosophical and Legal Problem, which took place at Universidad de Medellín between the 16th to the 18th of March in 2017. He was also the director of the congress  Somos Memoria. La Escuela de Madrid y El Exilio Español del 39 at Instituto Cervantes in Berlin (2013). In collaboration with Volker Gerhardt, he directed the congress Nature, Technique, Culture at the Humboldt-Universität zu Berlin (2008). 
Since 2008, Rohmer has been a permanent member of the Whitehead Research Project (WRP) in Claremont, California (United States), directed by Roland Faber. In 2019, he was working as Mercator-Fellow at the Catholic-Theological Faculty of the Ruhr University Bochum. 

Since 1987 Rohmer is committed and engaged for Navapalos Foundation. Navapalos Foundation - a non-profit organization devoted to promoting environmental awareness - was a pioneering project with his headquarters in Madrid  and the village Navapalos, located in the province of Soria, Castile and León, Spain. The Navapalos Foundation worked and investigated in building with earth, Low-cost housing-conceptions (based on Wattle and daub-techniques), Renewable energy and Sustainable development.

Publications

Monographs 
  Rohmer, Stascha, Die Idee des Lebens. Zum Begriff der Grenze bei Hegel und Plessner, Freiburg/Munich: Karl Alber 2016. 
 Rohmer, Stascha, Amor.El porvenir de una emoción (Originaltitel: Liebe - Zukunft einer Emotion), translated from German into Spanish by Ana María Rabe and Gabriel Menéndez Torrellas, Barcelona: Herder 2013. .
 Rohmer, Stascha, Liebe – Zukunft einer Emotion, Freiburg/Munich: Karl Alber 2008. 
 Rohmer, Stascha, Whiteheads Synthese von Kreativität und Rationalität, Reflexion und Transformation in Alfred North Whiteheads Philosophie der Natur, Freiburg/Munich: Karl Alber  2000.

Editions and Translations (selection) 
 Rohmer, Stascha; Toepfer, Georg, Anthropozän – Klimawandel – Biodiversität: Transdisziplinäre Perspektiven auf das gewandelte Verhältnis von Mensch und Natur, Freiburg/München: Karl Alber 07/2021. ISBN 978-3-495-49041-9.
 Rohmer, Stascha; Rabe, Ana María, Homo Naturalis. Zur Stellung des Menschen innerhalb der Natur, Freiburg/Munich: Karl Alber 2012. 
 Ortega y Gasset, José, Der Mensch ist eine Fremder. Schriften zur Metaphysik und Lebensphilosophie, translated from Spanish into German by Stascha Rohmer (ed.), Freiburg/Munich: Karl Alber 2008. 
 Whitehead, Alfred North, Denkweisen (Originaltitel:Modes of Thought), translated from English into German by Stascha Rohmer (ed.), Frankfurt on the main: Suhrkamp 2001.

Articles (selection) 
 ¿Existen maquinas vivientes? Sobre la relación entre vida y técnica in: Isegoria. Revista de Filosofía moral y política, Nr. 55, pp. 595–614.
 The Self-Evidence of Civilization, in: Roland Faber, G. Brian Henning, Clinton Combs (Hg.), “Beyond Metaphysics? Explorations in Alfred North Whitehead’s Late Thought”, book series Contemporary Whitehead Studies,  New York: Rodopi Publishing House 2010, chap. 13, pp. 215–225. E-
 Einführung in Ortega y Gassets Lebensphilosophie, in: José Ortega y Gasset, Der Mensch ist ein Fremder, Schriften zur Metaphysik und Lebensphilosophie, Freiburg/Munich: Karl Alber 2008, pp. 7–26.

References

External links 

 * 
 Rohmer´s home page: http://www.stascha-rohmer.de/
 Rohmer´s page at the Administrative Department of Science, Technology and Innovation (Colciencias); Colombia: http://scienti.colciencias.gov.co:8081/cvlac/visualizador/generarCurriculoCv.do?cod_rh=0001620737

Metaphysicians
1966 births
Living people
20th-century German philosophers
21st-century German philosophers
Technical University of Berlin alumni